The Rainha Santa Isabel Bridge (Portuguese: Ponte Rainha Santa Isabel) is a cable-stayed bridge with semi-fan system completed in 2003 and opened in 2004, crossing the Mondego River. Although it had an initial estimated value of €38.65 million, it severely surpassed that to €59.3 million.

The construction of this bridge permitted a quicker access to the south of the city of Coimbra, namely to Pólo II section of the University of Coimbra. It carries N17 but connects to IC2. Construction was interrupted in October 2002 due to "alleged threat of collapse" During its construction it was known as Ponte Europa (Europe Bridge) which still holds as an alternate name, although not official.

References

External links 

 "Coimbra: Derrapagem da Ponte Europa chega a tribunal - JN". www.jn.pt (in Portuguese). Retrieved 2020-09-15.

Cable-stayed bridges in Portugal
Buildings and structures in Coimbra
Bridges completed in 2003